Paul John Kevin Mooney (born 15 October 1976) is a former Irish cricketer.

A member of the successful North County, Mooney is a medium-pace bowler and competent lower-order batsman. He first appeared for Ireland in 1998 against Marylebone Cricket Club at Lurgan. While he has so many achievements he has one downfall he lives in the shadow of his legendary, god like younger brother John Mooney. (cricketer)|John]].

Mooney has often reserved his best efforts at international level for fixtures involving more exalted opposition, most notably against Zimbabwe at Clontarf in June 2000, when he removed both Andy and Grant Flower for nought in the process of contributing 4-24 to Ireland's forlorn defence of a meagre total. Three years later, Mooney's 2-19 was a crucial component of Ireland's 10-wicket victory over the same opposition at Stormont. He also featured in Ireland's historic victory over the West Indies at the Belfast venue in June 2004, when three valuable wickets mitigated the 67 runs Mooney surrendered off his ten overs.

Mooney, a survivor of Ireland's disastrous 2001 ICC Trophy campaign in Canada (where his 4–17 against Bermuda emerged as a rare highlight of a catastrophic tour), featured in all six matches at the 2005 event, which Ireland hosted. An integral member of the formidable bowling unit which served Ireland so well, Mooney took eight wickets at 25.12 (including 3–10 against Uganda) as Ireland claimed the runners-up position and consequent qualification for the 2007 Cricket World Cup. Mooney has been named in the Irish squad which will challenge Pakistan, Zimbabwe, and the West Indian hosts in Group D of the competition. As of September 2006, he has appeared in one ODI against England.

On 20 April 2007, after Ireland's campaign in the 2007 World Cup, where he played one match in the tournament and the team qualified for the super eights, Mooney announced his retirement from cricket at the age of 30. Looking back at his career for Ireland, he said "I have been fortunate to have represented Ireland for ten years now, and during that period I have had some of the best times and experiences of my life".

From 2008 to 2010, he was the head coach of a cricket club in Christchurch, New Zealand.

References

External links
 
 North County Cricket Club

1976 births
Living people
Ireland One Day International cricketers
Cricketers from County Dublin
Irish cricketers